Alistair Ian Hughes Paterson  (born 1929) is a New Zealand writer and poet. A long-time editor of the literary journal Poetry New Zealand, Paterson was appointed an Officer of the New Zealand Order of Merit, for services to literature, in the 2006 Queen's Birthday Honours.

History
Paterson was born in Nelson, New Zealand in 1929. He received his education from Nelson College (1943–47), Christchurch Teachers' College, and Victoria University of Wellington and earned a Bachelor of Arts degree  and Diploma of Education. In the 1970s, Paterson served as a naval officer at the Devonport Naval Base, the home of the Royal New Zealand Navy. In 1982, Paterson was a joint winner of Auckland University's John Cowie Reid Memorial Award for longer poems. In 1993, one of Paterson's short stories earned him the Bank of New Zealand Katherine Mansfield Award, which was established in 1959 to help new and established New Zealand authors achieve recognition and promote writing. In 1994, Paterson published the novel, How to be a Millionaire by Next Wednesday. Around that time, he became editor of Poetry New Zealand, a literary journal.

In 2001, Paterson chose, as the featured poet in Poetry New Zealand, Pooja Mittal, whom he described as a genius and "the best young poet of all." In December of that year, Paterson hosted a "poetry and champagne" event at the French Embassy in Wellington. The event was Paterson's way of marking the 50th anniversary of Poetry New Zealand, the literary journal then edited by Paterson. Paterson also chose the French Embassy as a way of promoting 23 November issue of the journal which featured work by French poets such as Jacques Darras. In 2003, New Zealand poet and critic Iain Sharp said of Paterson's work with Poetry New Zealand, "Since 1993 he has edited Poetry NZ magazine, tirelessly sending advice to dozens of actual and would-be contributors. I doubt if any other New Zealand editor has been quite so generous with his or her time." That same year, Paterson published Summer on the Cote d'Azur, a collection of social and political observation, and romantic theme poems written by Paterson between 1987 and 2003. By 2004, Paterson had opened a Poetry NZ office in Palm Springs, California. At that time, it was the only New Zealand literary journal with an overseas office.

In the 2006 Queen's Birthday Honours, Paterson was appointed an Officer of the New Zealand Order of Merit, for services to literature. In 2008, Paterson published the long poem Africa.

Awards
 1982 Auckland University's John Cowie Reid Memorial Award for longer poems (joint winner)
 1993 Bank of New Zealand's Katherine Mansfield Memorial Award for short stories

Selected publications 
1960s
 
1970s
 
 
 
1980s
 
 
 
 
1990s
 
2000s
 
 
2010s
 Passant A Journey to Elsewhere, Austin Macauley Publishers Ltd, 2017

References

External links
 The Depot’s Cultural Icons project, an audio interview with Alistair Paterson
 Headworx biography of Alistair Paterson
 Poetryarchive.org biography of Alistair Paterson
 Poetry NZ, a literary journal where Paterson is editor

1929 births
Living people
New Zealand poets
New Zealand male poets
Officers of the New Zealand Order of Merit
People from Nelson, New Zealand
People educated at Nelson College
Victoria University of Wellington alumni